The Podcats is a French 3D animated television series of 78 episodes, produced by Okidoki Studio with Docks Dog Studio and the TV channel France 3. The first season has been aired 7 February 2009 on France 3 in the TV show Ludo. Next seasons were aired to France 4 and France Ô.

Each episode includes two sketches dealing with the same subject, and a third entitled Profcats explaining the theme of the day's show, such as boss, GPS, buzz, ping, etc. The episode ends generally with a musical performance of the Podcats in front of the public.

Overactive animation, manga faces, colorful environments and the many characters from different video game universes are characteristic of the series and give it a very particular style.

The work of animation, lighting and compositing was entrusted to Mokko Studio, a Montreal studio.

Synopsis
Four videogame characters decided to create a music group after having been tired of always staying in their respective games, this does not prevent them from returning to experience multiple adventures.

Characters
Senzo
Voiced by: Alexis Tomassian (French)
He is the lead singer of the band and the guitarist. It comes from a " Guitar Hero ", it's probably his super cool attitude that attracts so much Bella (Senzo ignores it). He loves Bella very much, but does not dare to tell her for fear she will laugh at him.
His style: English pop manga, a "rockmantic" thing that makes girls crack
His passions: Less heroic in games than behind a guitar
Its bonus: a mixture of nonchalant charm and communicative enthusiasm
His items: "Redfire" of course, his guitar "cybervintage" strings stretched with pure energy

Bella
Voiced by: Diane Dassigny (French)
She is the band's keyboardist, is a Sims who has some difficulty controlling her emotions that inevitably trigger an avalanche of emoticons . It is for the leader of the group, Senzo, that she secretly has a crush.
Her style: Stylish
Her Bonus : Rock and balances
Her malus : Her emoticons betray all the emotions she has difficulty controlling
Her bonus: It is a rebel in the skin of a "girly"
Her items: A book of psychology and an interactive mirror

Gala
Voiced by: Jessica Barrier (French)
She is the bass player, she comes from an online multiplayer game, she is a magic elf who never separates from her spellbook. Unfortunately for the people around her, these spells rarely have the expected effect and cause many misfortunes that trigger many adventures.
Her style: Elvish
Her Passions: Rock and Magic
Her bonus: Her obstinacy. Always ready for adventure, she is afraid of nothing
Her malus: Her anger is noisy
Her item: A grimoire

Mimo
Voiced by: Carole Baillien (French)
He is the drummer, he comes out straight of a game of surfing, snowboarding , skateboarding . It has the relaxed Californian attitude typical of those who only think about finding their waves. He is also one of those video game fanatics who only think of beating their records.
His style: Californian too cool
His passions: Rock and DIY
His bonus: Putting his technological findings to the services of the group
His malus: Same
His items: The extension of his feet, a skateboard

Episodes

References 

 The Podcats hit the screen
 Okidoki Animation Studio Page

External links 
 
 The Podcats TV cartoon website
 The Podcats Trailer TV program website
 The Podcats TV cartoon website

2000s French animated television series
2010s French animated television series
2009 French television series debuts
French children's animated fantasy television series
French flash animated television series